The 5th Tennessee Infantry Regiment was an infantry regiment that served in the Union Army during the American Civil War.

Service
The 5th Tennessee Infantry was organized at Barbourville, Kentucky and Harrison, Tennessee February through March 1862 and mustered in for a three-year enlistment.

The regiment was attached to 25th Brigade, 7th Division, Army of the Ohio, to October 1863. 1st Brigade, District of West Virginia, Department of the Ohio, to November 1862. 1st Brigade, 2nd Division, Centre, XIV Corps, Army of the Cumberland, to January 1863. 1st Brigade, 2nd Division, XIV Corps, to April 1863. District of Central Kentucky, Department of the Ohio, to June 1863. 3rd Brigade, 3rd Division, XXIII Corps, Department of the Ohio, to August 1863. 3rd Brigade, 3rd Division, Reserve Corps, Army of the Cumberland, to October 1863. 2nd Brigade, 2nd Division, XIV Corps, to November 1863. Spear's Tennessee Brigade, Chattanooga, Tennessee, to December 1863. Spear's Tennessee Brigade, 2nd Division, XXIII Corps, to January 1864. 3rd Brigade, Rousseau's 3rd Division, XII Corps, Department of the Cumberland, to April 1864. 2nd Brigade, 3rd Division, XXIII Corps, Army of the Ohio, to June 1864. 3rd Brigade, 3rd Division, XXIII Corps, to December 1864. 2nd Brigade, 3rd Division, XXIII Corps, to January 1865. Post of Nashville, Tennessee, to February 1865. 2nd Brigade, 3rd Division, XXIII Corps, Department of North Carolina, to June 1865.

The 5th Tennessee Infantry mustered out of service on June 30, 1865.

Detailed service
Cumberland Gap Campaign March 28-June 18, 1862. Moved to Cumberland Ford April. Big Creek Gap June 11–12 and 15. Occupation of Cumberland Gap June 18-September 17. Cumberland Gap August 16. Expedition to Pine Mountain September 6–10. Big Creek Gap September 7. Evacuation of Cumberland Gap and retreat to Greenupsburg, Ky., September 17-October 3. Near Gallipolis, Ohio, and operations in the Kanawha Valley, W. Va., until November. Ordered to Louisville, Ky., thence to Cincinnati, Ohio, and Nashville, Tenn. Duty at Nashville until April 1863, and at Carthage, Tenn., until August. Ordered to McMinnville August 31. March to Chattanooga September 13–20. Sequatchie Valley September 21–23. Missionary Ridge and Shallow Ford Gap September 22. Near Summerville September 23. At Sale Creek until December. Ordered to Kingston Tenn. Near Kingston December 4. Duty near Knoxville and operations in eastern Tennessee until April 1864. Guard duty at Marietta until October. Operations against Hood in northern Georgia and northern Alabama October 3–26. Nashville Campaign November–December. Columbia Duck River November 24–27. Spring Hill November 29. Battle of Franklin November 30. Battle of Nashville December 15–16. Pursuit of Hood to the Tennessee River December 17–28. At Clifton, Tenn., until January 15, 1865. Moved to Washington. D. C., thence to Fort Fisher, N. C., January 16-February 9. Operations against Hoke February 11–14. Fort Anderson February 18. Town Creek February 20. Capture of Wilmington February 22. Campaign of the Carolinas March 1-April 26. Advance on Kinston and Goldsboro March 6–21. Occupation of Goldsboro March 21. Advance on Raleigh April 9–14. Occupation of Raleigh April 14. Bennett's House April 26. Surrender of Johnston and his army. Duty at Raleigh and Greensboro until June.

Casualties
The regiment lost a total of 246 men during service; 1 officer and 40 enlisted men killed or mortally wounded, 204 enlisted men died of accident or disease.

Commanders
 Colonel James T. Shelley
 Lieutenant Colonel Nathaniel Witt - commanded at the battle of Nashville

See also

 List of Tennessee Civil War units
 Tennessee in the Civil War

References

 Cannon, Robert K. Volunteers for Union and Liberty: History of the 5th Tennessee Infantry, U.S.A., 1862-1865 (Knoxville, TN:  Bohemian Brigade Pubs.), 1995.
 Dyer, Frederick H.  A Compendium of the War of the Rebellion (Des Moines, IA:  Dyer Pub. Co.), 1908.
 Wiefering, Edna. Tennessee Union Soldiers Vol. 1 (Cleveland, TN:  Cleveland Public Library), 1996.
Attribution

External links
 Site dedicated to the 5th Tennessee Infantry, includes roster

Military units and formations established in 1862
Military units and formations disestablished in 1865
Units and formations of the Union Army from Tennessee
1865 disestablishments in Tennessee
1862 establishments in Tennessee